Oh Lord! When? How? is the first official release from The Hives. It was released in 1996 on the Sidekicks label.

Track listing
"You Think You're So Darn Special"
"Cellblock"
"Some People Know All Too Well How Bad Liquorice (or Any Candy at That Matter) Can Taste When Having Laid Out in the Sun Too Long, and I Think I Just Ate Too Much"
"How Will I Cope With That?"
"Bearded Lady"
"Let Me Go"

Personnel
 Howlin' Pelle Almqvist - vocals
 Nicholaus Arson - lead guitar
 Vigilante Carlstroem - rhythm guitar
 Dr. Matt Destruction - bass guitar
 Chris Dangerous - drums

The Hives albums
1996 EPs